The shch-el-1 (Cyrillic script: Щэл1)  was the Soviet Union's first diesel locomotive.  It was designed by Yakov Modestovich Gakkel and built by the Putilov Plant and the Baltic Shipyard in Petrograd (St. Petersburg, Russia). It was completed in 1924 and named "The Lenin Memorial Diesel Locomotive".

Powertrain
The prime mover was a Vickers 10 cylinder diesel engine.  According to Westwood, this was "presumably salvaged from a British submarine lost in the Baltic in 1919". The electric generators were also of submarine type but were made in Italy. Details of the traction motors are unknown.

Service
After trials, the locomotive worked on the Moscow-Kursk line but spent a lot of time out of service. It was withdrawn in 1927, after covering 25,000 miles, and was then put to work as a mobile generator.

Preservation
The locomotive is preserved at the Russian Railway Museum in Saint Petersburg.

References

Railway locomotives introduced in 1924
shch-el-1
5 ft gauge locomotives